The 2016–17 Lipscomb Bisons men's basketball team represented Lipscomb University during the 2016–17 NCAA Division I men's basketball season. The Bisons, led by fourth-year head coach Casey Alexander, played their home games at Allen Arena in Nashville, Tennessee as members of the Atlantic Sun Conference. They finished the season 20–13, 11–3 in ASUN play to finish in second place. As the No. 2 seed in the ASUN tournament, they defeated NJIT in the quarterfinals to advance to the semifinals where they lost to North Florida. Despite having 20 wins, they did not participate in a postseason tournament.

Previous season
The Bisons finished the 2015–16 season 12–21, 7–7 in A-Sun play to finish in a tie for fifth place. They defeated Jacksonville in the quarterfinals of the A-Sun tournament to advance to the semifinals where they lost to Stetson.

Roster

Schedule and results
 
|-
!colspan=9 style=| Non-conference regular season

|-
!colspan=9 style=| Atlantic Sun Conference regular season

|-
!colspan=9 style=| Atlantic Sun tournament

References

Lipscomb Bisons men's basketball seasons
Lipscomb